Jastana village is located in Bonli tehsil of Sawai Madhopur district, Rajasthan, India.

References

Sawai Madhopur district